The Archaeology of Iran encompasses the following subjects:

Archaeological discoveries in Iran
Archaeological sites in Iran:
Rock art in Iran
Great Wall of Gorgan
Hasanlu Lovers
Islamic ceramics from the Susa site
Achaemenid inscription in the Kharg Island
Achaemenid Persian Lion Rhyton
Acropole Tomb
Apadana hoard
Bardak Siah Palace
Bushel with ibex motifs
Code of Hammurabi
Egyptian statue of Darius I
Golden bowl of Hasanlu
Luristan bronze
Musicians plate
Narundi
Nazimaruttaš kudurru stone
Parchments of Avroman
Parthian bas-relief at Mydan Mishan
Persepolis Administrative Archives
Shami statue
Statue of Hercules in Behistun
Victory Stele of Naram-Sin
Ziwiye hoard

Archaeologists
Roland de Mecquenem (archaeologist)
Frank Hole
Geneviève Dollfus
Roman Ghirshman
Wolfram Kleiss
Jean Perrot
Henry T. Wright

Iranian archaeologists
Kamyar Abdi (born 1969) Iranian; Iran, Neolithic to the Bronze Age
Abbas Alizadeh (born 1951) Iranian; Iran
Massoud Azarnoush (1946–2008) Iranian; Sassanid archaeology
Fereidoun Biglari (born 1970) Iranian Kurdish; Paleolithic
Touraj Daryaee (born 1967) Iranian; ancient Persia (Iran)
Seifollah Kambakhshfard  (1929–2010) Iranian; Iron Age Temple of Anahita
Yousef Majidzadeh (born 1938) Iranian; Jiroft culture (Iran)
Sadegh Malek Shahmirzadi (1940–2020) Iranian; ancient Persia (Iran)
Marjan Mashkour (born 19??) Iranian; zooarchaeology of Europe and the Middle East
Ezzat Negahban (1926–2009) Iranian; Iran
Shahrokh Razmjou (1966) Iranian; Achaemenid Archaeology
Vesta Sarkhosh Curtis (1951) Iranian; the British Museum's Curator of Middle Eastern coins
Alireza Shapour Shahbazi (1942–2006) Iranian; Iran
Parviz Varjavand (1934–2007) Iranian; ancient Iran (Persia)

Archaeological institutions in Iran
Society for the National Heritage of Iran
Museum of Ancient Iran
National Museum of Iran
Zagros Paleolithic Museum
Iron Age museum

Archaeological cultures in Iran
Traditional water sources of Persian antiquity
Palaeolithic Era in Iran
Bus Mordeh phase
Kura-Araxes culture
Baradostian culture
Talish-Mugan culture
Trialetian Mesolithic
Zarzian culture
Gutian people
Jiroft culture

References

 
Archaeologists
Archaeology of Iran
Archaeological museums in Iran
Archaeological cultures in Iran
Archaeological discoveries in Iran